Crosshill Loch  is an impounding reservoir, located 1 kilometre south of the centre of Campbeltown, and is the source of water for the town's Whisky Distilleries: Springbank, Glengyle and Glen Scotia. The earthen dam is 14.3 metres high. Records show the dam was constructed prior to 1868.

See also
 List of reservoirs and dams in the United Kingdom

References

Sources
"Argyll and Bute Council Reservoirs Act 1975 Public Register"

Reservoirs in Argyll and Bute